Oloptum is a genus of flowering plants belonging to the family Poaceae.

Its native range is Macaronesia, Mediterranean to Iran.

Species:

Oloptum miliaceum 
Oloptum thomasii

References

Poaceae
Poaceae genera